The following highways are numbered 551:

Canada

  Highway 551

Korea, South

  Jungang Expressway Branch

Norway

 Norwegian National Road 551

United States

  County Route 551 (New Jersey)
  County Route 551 ((Erie County, New York))
  Ohio State Route 551
  Oregon Route 551
  Pennsylvania Route 551
  Puerto Rico Highway 551